Zimbabwean Americans are Americans of full or partial Zimbabwean ancestry. The Zimbabwean communities are localized, among other places, in California and Texas.

History 
The first great wave of immigration from Rhodesia (modern-day Zimbabwe) took place during and after the Rhodesian Bush War in the 1970s, a time when many white Rhodesian families emigrated due to political and economic conditions. Although initially they emigrated mostly to neighboring South Africa, because they shared English language and heritage, and the United Kingdom, the former colonial power, subsequently they increasingly emigrated to the United States and Australia, countries that, like the above, shared language and heritage. Following the independence of Zimbabwe from the UK in 1980, these immigrants identified themselves as Rhodesians, united by their shared struggles experienced during the Bush War.

In the 1980s, a second group of people from Zimbabwe came to the United States, mostly students that returned to their country after completing their studies. This emigration of students was increased in the 1990s and included both white and black people. Due to the difficulty in accessing university in your country, many Zimbabwean students emigrated to other countries to complete their studies. Most of them sought degrees linked to technology and business. Unlike earlier Zimbabwean students, many in the 1990s decided to live in the United States for good after completing their studies, given the negative economic situation in Zimbabwe and the job opportunities that they could find in the United States. Thus, the majority of Zimbabweans who have migrated to the United States during the past few decades have been students and young professionals.

Demographics
In 2014, the Zimbabwean population in the United States was noted as one of "a strong skilled and non-skilled diaspora population" that is also focused in South Africa, the UK and Australia. Thus, Zimbabweans in the United States make up just a small part of the Zimbabwean diaspora compared to the larger communities in South Africa and the United Kingdom. However, of Zimbabweans who have not yet emigrated but are considering it, a somewhat higher proportion state that the United States, rather than the United Kingdom, is their preferred destination; this may be due to harassment and discrimination that Zimbabweans have faced in the UK.

There are various conflicting unofficial figures regarding the number of Zimbabweans in the United States. The RAND Corporation estimated in 2000 that there were 59,000 Zimbabweans in the state of New York alone. In contrast, a 2008 estimate from the Association of Zimbabweans Based Abroad put the population of Zimbabweans in the entire United States at just 45,000.

There is a small community of Zimbabweans in Chicago, consisting primarily of former students at area universities. Other cities with Zimbabwean communities include Washington, D.C., New York City, Indianapolis, Dallas, Houston, Atlanta and Detroit.

Organizations 
There is an important organization in Indianapolis of Zimbabwean having annual celebrations of Independence Day (April 18) and other events, such as the first Annual Convention and Business Expo Zimbabwe in 2002. Due to the limited success of the Zimbabwean living in Chicago to create organizations (because their community is dispersed through the city), they have formed ties with the organization of Zimbabwe in Indianapolis. Other Zimbabwean association is the Zimbabwe-United States of America Alumni Association (ZUSAA).

Notable people 

 Farai Chideya
 Mati Hlatshwayo Davis
 Jabulani Dhliwayo
 Sean Fletcher
 Alexandra Govere
 Danai Gurira
 Philemon Hanneck
 Nyasha Hatendi
 Paul Maritz
 Julian Mavunga

 Masasa
 Charles Mudede
 Kristine Musademba
 Takudzwa Ngwenya
 Andrew Pattison
 James Thindwa
 Tinashe
 Tererai Trent
 Billy Woods (rapper)
 MF Doom

See also
 Zimbabwean diaspora
 Zimbabwean Canadians
 Zimbabweans in the United Kingdom
 Zimbabwean Australians
 Zimbabwean New Zealanders
 Southern Africans in the United States
 Kutsinhira Cultural Arts Center
 United States–Zimbabwe relations

References

Bibliography

 
Southern Africans in the United States